New Look  is a 1958 to 1959 British television show aired on ITV. It was produced by Associated Television (ATV). It was a comedy programme. Of the 12 episodes made, only five survive.

References

External links
New Look on IMDb

1958 British television series debuts
1959 British television series endings
English-language television shows
1950s British comedy television series
Black-and-white British television shows
ITV comedy